GEC Medical was a unit of the General Electric Company that was headquartered in what was known as East Lane Industrial Estate in North Wembley, behind the Hirst Research Centre which fronted East Lane. 

The East Lane Industrial Estate boasted a triangular illuminated rotating sign of the same design as the one at Scotland Yard, but translucent and coloured bright yellow. The company was known as Watson & Son (X-ray) Ltd. until the merger in the late 1960s with A. E. Dean and Co. of Croydon. Watson and Sons had originally manufactured microscopes and other optical instruments, but in the late 19th century had seen the opportunity of making X-ray equipment. They became part of GEC in the very early part of the 20th century. 

The main business of the merged GEC Medical was the manufacture of X-ray equipment, including X-ray tubes which were made under licence from a US company called Machlett Laboratories. Other products were the high voltage supplies needed for X-ray tubes, the tables for positioning patients and many other accessories. It also employed a fairly large number of people supplying spare parts and servicing the pieces of equipment that were sold by the company. In the late 1980s the company introduced the concept of using a higher than mains frequency in an X-ray power supply. One of the last products made by the company before it closed was a mammography unit. Until closure GEC Medical had around 40% of the UK market for medical imaging devices.

Magnetic Resonance Imaging 

GEC also funded some of the development of Magnetic Resonance Imaging (MRI) using resistive magnet technology. At the same time, EMI Medical who had introduced the CT Scanner some time before using the principle of Godfrey Hounsfield, for which he won the 1979 Nobel Prize for Physiology or Medicine, were developing MRI using cryogenic magnets - which gave a higher field strength. At the time the maximum field strength with a resistive magnet was about 0.1T. With a cryogenic magnet, 1.0 T was easily achieved. EMI Medical went bankrupt  at around this time so their interests in MRI were bought by GEC. This was a major impetus for GEC's acquisition of Picker Corporation in 1981. 

The merged company as Picker International had the first MRI scanner approved by the U.S. Food and Drug Administration (FDA) on the US market. However business in the following decade did not suit them, and despite winning an order for air-droppable X-ray units for the US Army, they closed the factory at Wembley in 1990, along with other sites in Canada and Germany.

Medical imaging
Medical technology companies of the United Kingdom
Defunct manufacturing companies of the United Kingdom
General Electric Company